"Gubbinal" is a poem from Wallace Stevens's first book of poetry,  Harmonium (1923). It is in the public domain according to Librivox.

Interpretation

It can be read as one of his "poems of epistemology", as B. J. Leggett styles it in his Nietzschean reading of Stevens' perspectivism, a minimalistic statement of his interest in the relationship between imagination and the world. The term 'gubbinal' may derive from 'gubbin', slang for a dullard, referring here to someone who takes the world to be ugly and the people sad.

Notes

References 

 Leggett, B.J. Early Stevens: The Nietzchean Intertext. 1982: Duke UP.
 Nicholson, Mervyn. "Reading Stevens' Riddles." College English, Vol. 50, No. 1. (Jan., 1988), pp. 13–31.
 Peterson, Margaret. Wallace Stevens and the idealist tradition. 1983: UMI Research Press

1921 poems
American poems
Poetry by Wallace Stevens